Hemidactylus paivae, also known as the Paiva's gecko, is a species of house gecko endemic to Angola.

References

Hemidactylus
Geckos of Africa
Reptiles of Angola
Endemic fauna of Angola
Reptiles described in 2020
Taxa named by Luis M. P. Ceríaco
Taxa named by Ishan Agarwal
Taxa named by Mariana P. Marques
Taxa named by Aaron M. Bauer